Sarah Gonçalves Correa (August 14, 1992 – May 2, 2015) was a Brazilian competitive swimmer.

In 2008, at 16 years old, Correa took 2nd place in the José Finkel Trophy (Brazilian championship) in the 1500-metre freestyle.
In 2009, she won the 1500 metre freestyle in the José Finkel Trophy.

At the 2010 South American Games, Correa won the gold medal in the 4×200-metre freestyle, beating the competition record.

She was at the 2010 Pan Pacific Swimming Championships in Irvine, where she finished 6th in the 4×200-metre freestyle, 32nd in the 200-metre freestyle, 25th in the 400-metre freestyle, and 20th in the 800-metre freestyle.

Integrating national delegation that disputed the 2011 Pan American Games in Guadalajara, she won the silver medal in the 4×200-metre freestyle  by participating at heats. She was also ranked 15th in the 800-metre freestyle.

Correa died after being hit by a car while waiting at a bus stop near her home in Barra da Tijuca, Rio de Janeiro on May 1, 2015. She was hospitalized, but died from serious head injuries on May 2.

References

1992 births
2015 deaths
Swimmers from Rio de Janeiro (city)
Swimmers at the 2011 Pan American Games
Pedestrian road incident deaths
Road incident deaths in Brazil
Pan American Games silver medalists for Brazil
Pan American Games medalists in swimming
South American Games gold medalists for Brazil
South American Games medalists in swimming
Competitors at the 2010 South American Games
Medalists at the 2011 Pan American Games
Brazilian female freestyle swimmers
20th-century Brazilian women
21st-century Brazilian women